The Heinkel He 64 was a sports plane built in Germany in 1933 to participate in the touring plane championships that year, designed by Siegfried and Walter Günter.

Development
The He 64 was a sleek, low-wing monoplane of conventional configuration with fixed, tailskid undercarriage. The pilot and passenger sat in tandem under a streamlined canopy. Six examples were entered in the championships, which represented almost every example of the type built, the only exception being the first prototype, which had crashed.

Operational history
The He 64s shone in speed-related trials, taking the first three places in the 7,363 km (4,601 mi) Europa Rundflug ("Rally over Europe"), and the first five places in top speed trials. They also had high positions in minimal speed trial. Although no He 64 had won in any of the other categories, these wins were sufficient to gain pilot Fritz Morzik an overall tied second place in the contest.

One He 64C was imported into the United Kingdom in 1933 for flap research, at first with Handley Page then with the Royal Aircraft Establishment until 1935. This aircraft later flew in Rhodesia until 1952.

Variants
He 64aThe prototype of the He 64 family.
He 64bInitial production version
He 64cLater production offering a variety of powerplants, including the de Havilland Gipsy III, Hirth HM 504A-2 and Hirth HM 506
He 64dTwo examples of a high speed version were built, powered by the standard Argus As 8R but with elliptical planform wings similar to those fitted to the He 70 and no Handley Page slats.

Specifications (He 64b)

References

Bibliography

 Heinze, Edwin P.A. "The New Heinkel He 64". Flight: 848-50, 9 September 1932. Retrieved: 24 April 2008.
 Nowarra, Heinz. Die deutsche Luftrüstung 1933-1945. Bonn: Bernard and Graefe, 1983, pp. Teil 2, 173–175. 
 Taylor, Michael J.H. Jane's Encyclopedia of Aviation. London: Studio Editions, 1989, pp. 501. .

External links

 Heinkel He-64

1930s German sport aircraft
He 064
Single-engined tractor aircraft
Low-wing aircraft
Aircraft first flown in 1933